Lakeforest Mall, also known as Lakeforest, is an enclosed shopping center located in Gaithersburg, Maryland. It is owned by WRS Inc. Real Estate Investments who is planning to redevelop the site. Currently its two levels house approximately 15 stores, a food court, and until 2013, formerly a large children's play area at the center. Following the closure of three of its four anchor stores, JCPenney, Lord & Taylor, and Sears in 2019, Macy's remained as the mall's final remaining one until it closed in early 2023, with the rest of the mall closing shortly after. Following its closure, the mall is planned to be demolished the following year at the soonest.

History

1970s
Lakeforest Mall first opened on September 12, 1978. At that time, the mall's anchor stores were JCPenney, Sears, Woodward & Lothrop, and Hecht's. The mall was named in honor of Lake Walker, a man-made lake and park on the property prior. The mall opened with approximately 30-50 stores, with some of the first stores being relocated from the then nearby indoor Village Mall (now an outdoor strip mall called Montgomery Village Center since circa 1991) and absorbed onto the property. The mall was one of the first in the United States to feature an indoor ice skating rink on the lower level, in the "H section", along with being the biggest indoor shopping mall in the county at the time of grand opening. The rink has since been superseded first by a multi-theater movie complex, then by a food court, which now occupies the place.

1980s
In 1984, the ice rink was replaced by a NTI Theaters movie theater, later renamed Cineplex Odeon Lakeforest 5.

1990s
Circa 1994, the general manager was Barbara Kreuser.

In 1995, the Woodward & Lothrop at the mall closed and was replaced by Lord & Taylor in 1996. Lakeforest was host to a Friendly's and a Long John Silver's during the 1990s; they have since closed down.

On August 20, 1998, Taubman Centers sold the property to GM Pension Trust. Circa September 1998, some parking lot space was devoted to become the Lakeforest Transit Center with a Park and Ride.

2000s
In January 2000, the Cineplex Odeon Lakeforest 5 movie theater was closed.

In November 2000, a food court called Cafes in the Forest was introduced where the Cineplex Odeon Lakeforest 5 movie theater once was and started out with nine food businesses, with roughly half a dozen food eateries already in the mall prior to the food court.

In 2003, Simon Property Group purchased the mall.

On May 28, 2006, Macy's replaced Hecht's, as the latter had begun to be purchased by Macy's nationwide.

Originally developed, owned and operated by Taubman Centers, the mall has been owned and managed by the Simon Property Group since 2007, when it purchased former owner and manager Mills Corporation. The company defaulted on its mortgage in 2011 and the mall was put up for sale after.

2010s

In 2012, the mall took in $14,680,000 in net income.

In 2013, Five Mile Capital Partners hired real estate developer Hines to "map out a long-term plan for Lakeforest". A brand new children's play area opened on the ground floor infront of the then JCPenney on July 30, 2013, with the original children's play area called Professor Frog's Courtyard and nearby fountain in the center court were removed and tiled over in August 2013.

In 2016, the mall took in $6,180,000 in net income.

On August 22, 2017, Gaithersburg's Lakeforest Mall was sold at auction for $19.1 million, a fraction of the $100 million price tag from 2012.  The auction came after the mall's owner, Five Mile Capital, went into foreclosure.

As of August 2017, the mall's general manager is Paul DeMarco.  The Annapolis-based Petrie Richardson Ventures has Lakeforest under contract, which would not include the anchor stores in a potential purchase, but as of February 2018 the deal has not been closed.

On February 28, 2019 it was announced that JCPenney would be closing as part of a plan to close 27 stores in the U.S.; the store closed on July 5, 2019.

On June 5, 2019, Gaithersburg City Councilmember, Ryan Spiegel, tweeted that Lord & Taylor was planning to close its Lakeforest Mall location on September 15, 2019.  This left Macy's and Sears as the only anchor stores left open before any redevelopment, as publicly desired by the Gaithersburg municipal government, could be considered.  The store closed on September 15, 2019 as scheduled.

In 2019, WRS Inc. Real Estate Investments purchased the mall from U.S. Bank, which had bought it in 2018. WRS Inc. is planning to redevelop the entire 100 acres.

On August 31, 2019 it was announced that Sears would be closing its location at Lakeforest Mall as part of a plan to close 92 stores across the U.S.; the store closed on December 1, 2019, leaving Macy's as the only anchor left.

2020s
On October 20, 2022, WRS Inc. announced that Lakeforest Mall would be demolished by 2024, with a more specific date being announced later in 2023. Unfinalized redevelopment proposal plans include relocating the Lakeforest Transit Center and Park and Ride from alongside Lost Knife Rd. to Russell Ave., townhouses, office buildings, a parking garage near the center of brand new stores, a movie theater, cleaning up the three ponds to have a boardwalk built on top, and among others.

On January 4, 2023, it was announced that Macy's would be closed as part of a plan to close 4 stores nationwide, all inside underperforming indoor shopping malls. This left the mall with no anchors left. The store closed on March 18, 2023 via liquidation sales that started on January 9, 2023. Photos from this time period showcase an empty shell of what was a hub for shopping back in the American Mall Boom of the 1960's and 70's, now sitting here almost gone for good and was a shining light of an era that no longer exists.

On January 17, 2023, at the hearing on the Lakeforest Mall redevelopment plan in City Hall in Gaithersburg, MD, with lack of any open anchor store in the future, Kevin Rogers of WRS Inc. announced that Lakeforest Mall and all its entirety would be closing on March 31, 2023 after 44 years of serving the nearby community.  However, it is currently not certain whether the mall would be demolished; should redevelopment plans be rejected, there is a small possibility that the mall building itself could be repurposed.

Anchors

Former anchors
JCPenney (1978–2019)
Sears (1978–2019)
Lord & Taylor (1996–2019), replacing original tenant Woodward & Lothrop (1978–1995)
Macy's (2006–2023), after acquiring original tenant Hecht's (1978–2006)

Gallery

References

External links

    

  

1978 establishments in Maryland
Buildings and structures in Gaithersburg, Maryland
Shopping malls established in 1978
Shopping malls in Maryland
Defunct shopping malls in the United States
Shopping malls in the Washington metropolitan area
Tourist attractions in Montgomery County, Maryland
Shopping malls disestablished in 2023